The 1941–42 season was Fussball Club Basel 1893's 48th season in their existence. It was their third season in the 1st League (second flight of Swiss football) after being relegated from the Nationalliga in the 1938–39 season. They played their home games in the Landhof, in the Wettstein Quarter in Kleinbasel. Albert Besse was the club's chairman for the third consecutive year. The team achieved promotion and reached the Swiss Cup final.

Overview 
Eugen Rupf was player-coach for his second season. Basel played 38 games in their 1941–42 season. 22 in the league group, two in the play-offs, 10 in the cup and 4 were test games. They won 27 and drew eight, they were defeated only three times. In total they scored 114 goals and conceded just 33-

There were twenty four teams contesting in the 1st League in the 1941–42 season, twelve in group East and twelve in group West. The winner of each group were to play a play-off for promotion to the Nationalliga the following year. Basel were allocated to group East together with the two other local teams Concordia Basel and FC Birsfelden. Basel started the league season well. On 31 August 1941 in the first league game against SC Juventus Zürich their striker Alex Mathys scored seven goals as Basel won by 10–1. There is no indication or evidence in the history books that this was not a goal scoring record for a single FCB player in a single match in the club's entire history. In the game on 18 January 1942 against Schaffhausen Basel won 11–0 and Erhard Grieder scored five goals. Basel finished their season as winners of group East while FC Birsfelden and Concordia were able to hold themselves clear of the relegation zone. Basel managed 18 victories and 3 draws from their 22 games, just one defeat. With a total of 39 points, scoring 77 and conceding just 15 goals Basel were five points clear of second placed Blue Stars Zürich. The promotion play-offs were then against group West winners FC Bern. The 1st leg was the away tie, this ended with a goalless draw. Basel won the 2nd leg at home at the Landhof 3–1 to achieve Promotion.

In the Swiss Cup Basel started in the 2nd principal round and were drawn at home against local rivals Old Boys. Basel won 4–2 after extra time. In round 3 they were drawn at home and won 1–0 against another local team FC Birsfelden. The fourth round was another home tie and they beat the higher tier Nationalliga team BSC Young Boys by three goals to nil. The next round gave Basel another home tie against 1st League team Solothurn and they completed an easy victory, winning 6–1. The quarter-final draw saw them playing at home again, this time against Nationlige team Lugano. The game ended 1–1 after extra time. The two clubs could not agree on a date for the replay, therefore the winners were to be decided by lottery decision. Basel qualified on toss of a coin. The semi-final gave Basel their sixth home match and their third Nationalliga club FC Grenchen. On March 29 at Stadion Rankhof the semi-final between Basel and Grenchen ended with a goalless draw after extra time. A replay, on 4 April, was required. In the Gurzelen Stadion in Biel/Bienne the replay ended with a victory. Hermann Suter scored both Basel goals as they won 2–0.

Basel thus qualified for the final which was just two days later on 6 April in the Wankdorf Stadion in Bern against the Nationalliga team Grasshopper Club. The final ended goalless after extra time and a replay was required here as well. The replay did not take place until the end of May because the Nationalliga championship had ended with a heat and thus a play-off was required here too between the Grasshoppers and Grenchen. In fact it required two games, the first ended 0–0 in Bern, the seconded ended 1–1 in Basel. The championship title was awarded to GC on goal average. The cup final replay was on 25 May, again in the Wankdorf Stadion, against the then Nationalliga champions Grasshoppers. Basel led by half time through two goals by Fritz Schmidlin, but two goals from Grubenmann a third from Neukom gave the Grasshoppers a 3–2 victory. Thus the Grasshoppers won the double.

Players 

 
 
 

 
 

 

  

 

Players who left the squad

Results

Legend

Friendly matches

Pre and mid-season

Winter break

Nationalliga

1st League group East, matches

1st League group East, table

Promotion play-off

Basel won 3–1 on aggregate

Swiss Cup

Notes

See also
 History of FC Basel
 List of FC Basel players
 List of FC Basel seasons

References

Sources 
 Rotblau: Jahrbuch Saison 2014/2015. Publisher: FC Basel Marketing AG. 
 Die ersten 125 Jahre. Publisher: Josef Zindel im Friedrich Reinhardt Verlag, Basel. 
 FCB team 1941–42 at fcb-archiv.ch
 Switzerland 1941–42 at RSSSF

External links
 FC Basel official site

FC Basel seasons
Basel